The Australian Orangutan Project t/a The Orangutan Project (TOP) is a non-profit registered Australian environmental organisation established in 1998, which raises funds to support the conservation and protection of orangutans and the preservation and rehabilitation of their forest habitats, which are primarily located in Indonesia. It undertakes this work by supporting a range of other organisations working in the field, such as the Borneo Orangutan Survival Foundation (BOS), the Orangutan Foundation International, founded by Dr Birute Galdikas and the Orangutan Foundation.

Donations from the public, funds from community events, AOP membership fees, orphan orangutan 'adoptions' and grants from various sources are used to support orangutan care centres, natural forest rehabilitation, forest patrols to eliminate illegal logging and protect released animals, and local community awareness initiatives. In 2005, the organisation received over $62,000 from the Australian Government's Regional Natural Heritage Program (RNHP) to develop and implement two orangutan protection units in the Bukit Tigapuluh National Park region in Sumatra and to monitor and deter illegal logging in two regions. This project contributes to the long term conservation of the largest remaining lowland rainforest block in Sumatra. In 2006, TOP won an additional $92,000 from the RNHP to extend the work of the orangutan protection units to better protect the Bukit Tigapuluh mega fauna, including the Sumatran elephant and tiger, through training, monitoring and surveillance activities. AOP also was awarded funds of A$207,500 to undertake a survey of wildlife in Borneo's forests in Malua/Segama. This includes surveys of the Ulu Segama reserve to establish wildlife baseline data and the development of a Forest Management Plan with particular focus on orangutan populations.

The Orangutan Project's founder and current President is Leif Cocks.  Leif has been working with orangutans for over 30 years. Leif has been awarded a Master of Science from Curtin University, Western Australia for his research into the improvement of the welfare of orangutans in captivity. 
His book  Orangutans and their Battle for Survival was published by the University of Western Australia in 2003. He recently published an autobiography titled "Orangutans, My Cousins, My Friends.  Leif has been involved with numerous projects and field trips to Sumatra and Borneo, including the first ever release into the wild of an orangutan, known as 'Temara,’ who was born in captivity.

References

Further reading
 Australian Department of the Environment and Water Resources. "RNHP Projects for 2004–05". Accessed 1 August 2007.
 Australian Department of the Environment and Water Resources. "RNHP Projects for 2006–07". Accessed 1 August 2007.
Cocks, L (2003) Orangutans and their Battle for Survival. University of Western Australia Press. .
Embassy of Indonesia, Canberra, Australia. "Media release: Australian born orang-utan to swing back into Indonesian national park". Accessed 1 August 2007

External links
Australian Orangutan Project
The Orangutan Foundation

Nature conservation organisations based in Australia
1998 establishments in Australia
Orangutan conservation